Rubén García Canales (born 20 October 1998) is a Spanish professional footballer who plays for Greek Super League club Asteras Tripolis FC as a right back.

Club career
García was born in Elche, Alicante, Valencian Community, and was an Elche CF youth graduate. He made his senior debut with the reserves on 1 March 2015, starting in a 0–0 Segunda División B home draw against UE Olot.

In 2015, García moved to FC Barcelona and returned to the youth setup. He subsequently returned to the Franjiverdes in the following year, and was definitely promoted to the B-side ahead of the 2017–18 campaign.

On 5 August 2018, García signed for third division side CD Castellón. The following 4 July, he terminated his contract with the club, and agreed to a two-year deal with Atlético Levante UD four days later.

On 31 August 2020, García moved abroad and joined Super League Greece side Asteras Tripolis FC. He made his professional debut on 13 September, coming on as a late substitute for Xesc Regis in a 1–0 home win against Panathinaikos FC.

References

External links

1998 births
Living people
Footballers from Elche
Spanish footballers
Association football defenders
Segunda División B players
Tercera División players
Elche CF Ilicitano footballers
CD Castellón footballers
Atlético Levante UD players
Super League Greece players
Asteras Tripolis F.C. players
Spanish expatriate footballers
Spanish expatriate sportspeople in Greece
Expatriate footballers in Greece